Jon and Vangelis was a music collaboration between British rock singer Jon Anderson (lead vocalist of the progressive rock band Yes) and Greek synthesiser musician Vangelis. The duo released four albums between 1980 and 1991.

History
In 1974, Vangelis was considered as a replacement for Rick Wakeman as keyboardist in Yes, and although the job went to Patrick Moraz, it led to several collaborations with Anderson, who contributed vocals to Vangelis' Heaven and Hell (1975) on the song "So Long Ago, So Clear", harp to Opera Sauvage (1979) on "Flamants Roses" and finally vocals to See You Later (1980) on "Suffocation" and "See You Later".

They recorded their first album together, Short Stories, in 1979, producing the major hit "I Hear You Now" as well as "One More Time". Anderson wrote the lyrics and Vangelis composed the music. In 1980, Anderson left Yes and while he published his third solo album, Song of Seven in 1980, Vangelis did the same with See You Later on which Anderson sang two songs. The two reunited to record their second album, The Friends of Mr Cairo, in 1981, producing the hit songs "Friends of Mr Cairo", "State of Independence", "Back to School" and the UK top 10 hit "I'll Find My Way Home". In 1983, Anderson rejoined Yes and they released the album 90125. Jon and Vangelis released their own album, Private Collection, the same year.

In 1986, the duo made a few attempts at writing a new album, but much of this work was never officially released under the Jon and Vangelis name. Twelve tracks were compiled on 1991's Page of Life, while other songs from these sessions appeared in later works, including "Let's Pretend", the last song on the 1989 album Anderson Bruford Wakeman Howe. Anderson ultimately took it upon himself to rework Page of Life, which was released in 1998 in the United States only with nine tracks. In 2011, Anderson approached Vangelis for a possible new collaboration but he did not receive a reply.

Vangelis died on May 17, 2022.

Discography

Albums

Studio albums

Compilation albums

Singles

References

External links
Jon and Vangelis discography

Electronic music duos
Musical groups established in 1979
Musical groups disestablished in 1991
1979 establishments in England
1991 disestablishments in England
British synth-pop new wave groups
English pop music groups
Rock music supergroups
Vangelis